Peter Anthony Scott Farquhar (3 January 1946 – 26 October 2015) was a British novelist and former teacher of English for 34 years, at the Manchester Grammar School and Stowe School. He later lectured at Buckingham University.

Early life

Peter Farquhar was born in Edinburgh on 3 January 1946, the son of a physician. He was educated at Latymer Upper School in London and then Churchill College, Cambridge, where he achieved a first-class degree in English.

Career

Farquhar was a teacher of English for 34 years, firstly at the Manchester Grammar School (1970–82) and then Stowe School (1983–2004). From 2007 he was an occasional lecturer at Buckingham University. He was described by his friend and former pupil at Manchester, Michael Crick, as having "an acute understanding of the problems of modern adolescent boys. For some, he became almost like a second father."

His first novel, A Wide Wide Sea, a coming-of-age story about three teenagers from Edinburgh who travel to France and Spain on a voyage of self-discovery, was written in 1997 but not published until 2015. It was only published after two Buckingham University students, Ben Field and Martyn Smith, discovered the manuscript and persuaded Farquhar to publish it. His novel, Between Boy and Man, was published in 2010. The plot was heavily based on Farquhar's experience at Stowe School and concerns the struggle of a school chaplain to reconcile his Christian faith with his homosexuality.

The character of Dr Farquhar, played by Toby Stephens in the 2013 film Believe, directed by the former Manchester Grammar School pupil David Scheinmann, was partly based on Farquhar.

Farquhar was an evangelical Christian who once considered becoming a minister. He worshipped and preached at Stowe Parish Church for 20 years.

Murder
Farquhar died in Maids Moreton, Buckinghamshire, on 26 October 2015. His death was recorded as accidental as the result of acute alcohol intoxication. He was "betrothed" to former student Benjamin Field in 2015 and was survived by his brother, Ian. In January 2018, Field and magician friend Martyn Smith were arrested by police on suspicion of murdering Farquhar and attempting to murder his neighbour Ann Moore-Martin, 83. During his trial at Oxford Crown Court, Field admitted to drugging Farquhar with benzodiazepines and hallucinogens to "torment" him, telling the jury that he did it "for no other reason other than it was cruel, to upset and torment Peter – purely out of meanness". He also spiked his drink with bioethanol and Poitín in order to make him question his sanity, a form of gaslighting. According to prosecutors, Field suffocated Farquhar when he was too weak to resist.
 
On 9 August 2019, Benjamin Field was convicted of his murder, and on 18 October 2019 sentenced to life imprisonment.  Field was acquitted of the attempted murder of Moore-Martin.

"A Diary From the Grave", a documentary about the murders, aired on 13 January 2020 on Channel 4 as part of the Catching a Killer series.

Selected publications
 Between Boy and Man. AuthorHouse, 2010. 
 A Bitter Heart. AuthorHouse, 2012. 
 A Wide Wide Sea. Farquhar Studies, 2015.

In popular media
In 2020, BBC One commissioned The Sixth Commandment, a true crime drama written by Sarah Phelps about the murder.

References 

2015 deaths
Writers from Edinburgh
Schoolteachers from Edinburgh
People educated at Latymer Upper School
Alumni of Churchill College, Cambridge
1946 births
Scottish novelists
Scottish evangelicals
Scottish murder victims
People murdered in England
2015 murders in the United Kingdom